Igor Šimunčić (born 12 December 1973) is professional volleyball coach from Croatia. He is a former head coach of Croatia men's national volleyball team and many professional volleyball teams around Europe and also former professional volleyball player.

As a head coach of Croatian senior national team he was on CEV European Championship 2015 and won silver medal in CEV European league 2013.

As a member of the Croatian national team, Šimunčić competed at the 2002 World Championship and won bronze at the 1997 Mediterranean Games.

Place of birth: Zagreb, Croatia

Current team: none

National team head coach

 2005-2008 Croatia - junior men's national team head coach
 2012-2017 Croatia - senior men's national team head coach

Previous teams coached:

 2005-2006 MOK Zagreb (Croatia)
 2006-2007 Mladost Zagreb (Croatia)
 2008-2010 MOK Zagreb (Croatia)
 2010-2012 SK Posojilnica Aich/Dob (Austria)
 2013-2015 ZOK Vukovar woman team (Croatia)
 2016-2018 VCA Amstetten (Austria)
 2018-2020 Salonit Anhovo (Slovenia)
 2020-2021 VCA Amstetten (Austria)

Players career:

 1988-1993 Mladost Zagreb (Croatia)
 1993-1996 Salonit Anhovo (Slovenia)
 1997-1998 Plomien Sosnowiec (Poland)
 1999-2000 GFCOA Ajjaccio (France)
 2000-2002 Hypo Tirol Innsbruck (Austria)
 2002-2003 Omniworld Almere (The Netherlands)
 2003-2004 Salonit Anhovo (Slovenia)
 2004-2005 Pafiakos Pafos (Cyprus)

National team player career:

 1992-2002 Croatia (128 matches)

References

Living people
1973 births
Croatian volleyball coaches
Sportspeople from Zagreb
Mediterranean Games medalists in volleyball
Mediterranean Games bronze medalists for Croatia
Competitors at the 1997 Mediterranean Games